971 (nine hundred seventy one) is the natural number following 970 and preceding 972.

971 is a prime number, an emirp, a Chen prime and an Eisenstein prime.

Some uses of 971:
+971, the country calling code for telephone numbers in the United Arab Emirates
Area code 971, for telephone numbers in northwestern Oregon
One of the ISBN identifier groups for books published in the Philippines

U.S. state highways
As a U.S. state route or highway, 971 may refer to:
Louisiana Highway 971
Washington State Route 971
West Virginia Route 971

External links
 971 at Wolfram Alpha

Integers